Bukhameh may refer to:
 Bukhameh-ye Sofla
 Bukhameh-ye Vosta